Frederick Dennis Greene (January 11, 1949 – September 5, 2015) was an American singer who was a member of Sha Na Na who were formed in 1969 at Columbia University in New York as the Columbia Kingsmen. The name change to Sha Na Na occurred because of another group with a similar name, which was known for the song "Louie Louie".

The television show Sha Na Na aired from 1978 to 1981.  Greene choreographed most of the moves for the show, on which he was known simply as Denny.  Denny was portrayed in the series as the most intelligent member of Sha Na Na.  He sang lead in the song "Tears on My Pillow" when he appeared with Sha Na Na in the movie Grease, in 1978.  Denny also performed at Woodstock with Sha Na Na, just before Jimi Hendrix.

Education

Greene was born in New York, New York and raised in Harlem and the Bronx. He received his high school diploma from the Hotchkiss School.  He obtained a BA degree from Columbia University in 1971.  After he left Sha Na Na, he earned a Master of Education from Harvard University in 1984.  He then attended law school, which he had been interested in doing since childhood, graduating with a J.D. from Yale Law School in 1987.

Career

After Greene graduated from Yale Law School, he worked as Vice President of Production and Features at Columbia Pictures.  Following that, he was President at Lenox/Greene films.  He taught at Florida A&M University and the University of Oregon School of Law where he taught entertainment law, “Race, Mass Media, and the Law”, and other courses. He was also a visiting professor at several other universities including Ohio State, Seton Hall, and the University of Connecticut.

Greene also served on the Board of Directors for the Society of American Law Teachers and is listed in Who's Who Among African-Americans.

From December 2007 until his death, Greene was a Professor of Law at the University of Dayton School of Law, teaching classes such as Torts, Entertainment Law, and Constitutional Law.

Greene died in Dayton on September 5, 2015, from esophageal cancer just a few weeks after his diagnosis. He was 66.

Movie appearances

 1970 - Woodstock  - as himself with Sha Na Na
 1972 - Dynamite Chicken  - as himself with Sha Na Na
 1977 - Greased Lightning  - Slack
 1978 - Grease  -  with Sha Na Na as Johnny Casino and the Gamblers
 1994 -  Woodstock Diary  - as himself with Sha Na Na
 2003 -  Festival Express - as himself with Sha Na Na

Publications

 1994 Tragically Hip: Hollywood and African American Film
 1996 The Resurrection of Gunga Din, 81 Iowa Law Review 
 1997 Immigrants in Chains: Afrophobia in American Legal History, 76 Oregon Law Review 
 1998 Cultural Colonization in the Hollywood Film, 5 Asian Law Journal

References

External links
 
 University of Dayton School of Law
 The Shawnee News-Star Online
 Sha Na Na official site

1949 births
2015 deaths
American rock singers
Professional a cappella groups
Hotchkiss School alumni
Columbia University alumni
Harvard Graduate School of Education alumni
Sha Na Na members
University of Dayton faculty
Florida A&M University faculty
University of Oregon School of Law faculty
Yale Law School alumni
African-American rock musicians
Singers from New York City
20th-century African-American people
21st-century African-American people